Casa Navarro is a historic site in San Antonio, Bexar County, in the U.S. state of Texas. The original house complex was the residence of Texas patriot José Antonio Navarro (1795–1871), a rancher, merchant, leading advocate for Tejano rights, and one of only two native-born Texans to sign the Texas Declaration of Independence. Navarro first bought the property, about 1.5 acres, in 1832. The limestone, caliche block, and adobe structures were built c. 1832–1855, and Navarro moved onto the property soon after.

The site is situated in the heart of old San Antonio, in what used to be a thriving Tejano neighborhood known as Laredito. The structures were acquired and restored by the San Antonio Conservation Society between 1960 and 1964, and the site was opened to the public in October 1964. The site was designated a Texas State Historic Landmark in 1962, and listed on the National Register of Historic Places in 1972. On January 1, 2008, the house was transferred from the Texas Parks and Wildlife Department to the Texas Historical Commission. It was designated a National Historic Landmark in 2016.

Today, visitors can tour Navarro's one-story limestone house — a fine example of early-statehood domestic architecture — read copies of his writing and discuss questions of history with informed staff. There is also a two-story square store and office building, noted for its bold quoins, which anchor the edges of the building's walls. The detached adobe and caliche block kitchen is typical of early Texas architecture with front and rear porches.

See also
List of Texas state historic sites
List of National Historic Landmarks in Texas

References

External links 

 Casa Navarro State Historic Site website

Houses on the National Register of Historic Places in Texas
Houses completed in 1855
Texas state historic sites
Historic house museums in Texas
Mexican-American culture in San Antonio
Museums in San Antonio
Biographical museums in Texas
Houses in San Antonio
Museums established in 1964
Protected areas established in 1964
1964 establishments in Texas
National Register of Historic Places in San Antonio
Recorded Texas Historic Landmarks
National Historic Landmarks in Texas
National Register of Historic Places in Bexar County, Texas
Tejano culture